The 2014–15 CBA season was the 20th Chinese Basketball Association (CBA) season. The Jiangsu Tongxi Monkey Kings and Chongqing Fly Dragons were "promoted" to the CBA, becoming the league's 19th and 20th teams. Two clubs also altered or changed their mascots, with the Foshan Dralions opting to be called the Foshan Long-Lions in English, while the Shandong Gold Lions became the Shandong Golden Stars.

The regular season began on Saturday, November 1, 2014 with the Beijing Ducks hosting the Guangdong Southern Tigers. The 2015 CBA All-Star Game was played on January 18, 2015, at the Beijing National Indoor Stadium in Beijing. The regular season ended on Sunday, February 1, 2015, and the playoffs began on Friday, February 6, 2015.

Foreign players policy
All teams except the Bayi Rockets can have two foreign players while the bottom four teams from the previous season, as well as the Jiangsu Tongxi Monkey Kings and Chongqing Fly Dragons, have an additional right to sign an extra Asian player.

The rule of using players in each game is described in this chart:

+ Including players from Hong Kong and Chinese Taipei.

++ If teams waive their rights to sign the extra Asian player, they may use foreign players for 7 quarters collectively.

+++ Only 1 allowed in the 4th quarter.

Foreign players

Regular season
The regular season began on Saturday, November 1, 2014 with the Beijing Ducks hosting the Guangdong Southern Tigers. The regular season ended on February 1, 2015.

Standings

Playoffs

The 2015 CBA Playoffs began on Friday, February 6, 2015. The season champion is Beijing Ducks who succeeded in defending their title.

Bracket

Statistics leaders

Individual statistic leaders

Team statistic leaders

Awards

References

External links
CBA Official Website
CBA China - 2014-15 Standings and Stats on Basketball-Reference.com

 
Chinese Basketball Association seasons
League
CBA